Basilichthys australis is a species of Neotropical silverside fish which ist endemic to Chile from the Rio Maipo south to Chiloé Island.

References

australis
Freshwater fish of Chile
Taxonomy articles created by Polbot
Fish described in 1928
Endemic fauna of Chile